Rock Pockets is a Canadian short documentary film, directed by Trevor Anderson and released in 2006. Centred around the fact that heterosexual couples have the social freedom to walk around in public quietly communicating their relationship status by tucking their hands in each other's back pockets as they walk, while same-sex couples largely do not, the film depicts Anderson and musician Nik Kozub walking around the Klondike Days festival in Edmonton, Alberta, with their hands in each other's back pockets, and documents the range of reactions from onlookers.

The film premiered in 2006 as part of the Loud 'n' Queer Cabaret, Edmonton's annual LGBTQ arts festival.

It was named the winner of the inaugural Lindalee Tracey Award in 2007, and received an honourable mention for Most Innovative Short Film at the 2007 Seattle Lesbian & Gay Film Festival. In 2008, both Rock Pockets and Anderson's narrative short film DINX were shortlisted for the Iris Prize for LGBTQ-themed short films.

References

External links

2006 films
2006 short documentary films
2006 LGBT-related films
Canadian short documentary films
Canadian LGBT-related short films
Documentary films about LGBT topics
Films shot in Edmonton
Films set in Edmonton
English-language Canadian films
Films directed by Trevor Anderson
2000s English-language films
2000s Canadian films